Sørfjorden Church is a parish church of the Church of Norway in Rødøy Municipality in Nordland county, Norway. It is located in the village of Sørfjorden on the mainland in the southern part of the municipality. It is one of the churches in the Rødøy parish which is part of the Nord-Helgeland prosti (deanery) in the Diocese of Sør-Hålogaland. The white, wooden church was built in a long church style in 1916 using plans drawn up by the architect O.M. Olsen. The church seats about 130 people.

See also
List of churches in Sør-Hålogaland

References

Rødøy
Churches in Nordland
Wooden churches in Norway
20th-century Church of Norway church buildings
Churches completed in 1916
1916 establishments in Norway
Long churches in Norway